Nodicostellaria kremerae is a species of sea snail, a marine gastropod mollusk, in the family Costellariidae, the ribbed miters.

Description
Original description: "General shell form and sculpture as for genus; shoulder angled; spiral and axial cords large, with intersections producing uniform beaded surface; color pale tan with darker tan cloudings; interior of aperture pale tan."

Distribution
Locus typicus: "Off Puerto Fijo, Paraguana Peninsula, Gulf of Venezuela, Venezuela."

References

Costellariidae